Peter Weish (* 29 November 1936 in Vienna) is an Austrian scientist (biology, chemistry and physics), author and environmental activist.

Peter Weish studied biology, chemistry and physics at the University of Vienna. After receiving his doctorate of philosophy in 1966 he worked at the Institute for Nuclear Radiation Protection Centre Seibersdorf until 1970.

In 1969 he began a critical engagement with the health and societal aspects of nuclear energy. From 1974 he worked as a research officer at the Institute of Environmental Sciences and Conservation.

1984 he became a lecturer in Human Ecology at the University of Agricultural Sciences, Vienna.

In addition to his commitment to the nuclear industry (both in Austria and abroad) he dealt with questions from the environmental protection, environmental education, conservation and development cooperation. As part of his engagement for the environment, Dr. Peter Weish is working in numerous organizations and committees, for example: 

 Forum for Nuclear Affairs (advisory body to the Ministry responsible for nuclear matters)
 World Wide Fund for Nature

Decorations and awards
 Hans Adalbert Schweigart medal of the World Union for Protection of Life
 Eduard Paul Tratz Gold Medal of the Austrian Federal Nature Conservation
 Konrad Lorenz National Award for Environmental Protection
 2012: Austrian Cross of Honour for Science and Art, 1st class
 2006: Gold Medal of the Province of Vienna

References

External links 
 Website in German (University of Vienna)

1936 births
Scientists from Vienna
Living people
Sustainability advocates
Austrian anti–nuclear power activists
University of Vienna alumni
Recipients of the Austrian State Prize
Recipients of the Austrian Cross of Honour for Science and Art, 1st class